Kevin Roberts (born 17 August 1989) is an English professional footballer who plays as a defender for National League North club Chester.

Early life
Roberts was born in Liverpool, Merseyside.

Career

Chester City
Roberts started his career in Chester City's youth system in 2003, signing a professional contract in January 2007. His first involvement in the first team came as an unused substitute in a 2–0 away defeat to Lincoln City on 5 May 2007. He made his first-team debut as a substitute against Nottingham Forest in the League Cup first round tie on 14 August 2007 at home. After the match ended goalless, Roberts stepped up to take a penalty in the shoot-out but saw his effort saved as Chester went out 4–2 on penalties. Four days later he made his Football League debut in a 2–1 win at Rochdale, when he played the whole match.

Roberts' rise to prominence continued on 1 September 2007, when he came off the bench to score Chester's equaliser in a 1–1 draw at Rotherham United. His next goal enhanced his reputation further, as he scored a stunning volley in Chester's 2–2 derby draw with Wrexham on 25 November 2007. He went on to play regularly in the team for the remainder of the campaign, with several youth team contemporaries such as Paul McManus, Shaun Kelly and Glenn Rule joining him in the team. The following season again brought a regular starting place in the team in a defensive position, in a campaign that ended in relegation from League Two.

He remained with the club as they began the following season in the Conference Premier. All Chester City players' statistics for the 2009/10 season were expunged after Chester were expelled from the Conference Premier for breaking league regulations.

Cambridge United
Roberts joined Cambridge United in February 2010 after his contract with Chester was terminated, signing a contract until the end of the season.

Roberts signed a one-year contract extension at Cambridge United during the summer of 2010. Following a difficult season in which Cambridge battled relegation, Martin Ling was sacked and replaced by new manager Jez George, who signed Roberts to a further years contract for the 2011/12 season and reaffirmed his place as the club's first choice right back. Following a barren first 18 months at the club, Roberts scored his first goal for Cambridge in the club's 3–0 home victory against Southport, going on to add another two goals in his next three appearances.

On 4 October 2013, Roberts joined Conference North club Brackley Town on a one-month loan. He was released by Cambridge on 27 May 2014.

FC Halifax Town
He signed for Conference Premier club F.C. Halifax Town on 1 July 2014.

Wrexham
On 20 July 2017, Roberts signed for National League club Wrexham on a two-year contract for an undisclosed fee. He was released on 8 May 2019.

Chester
On 24 May 2019, Roberts signed for National League North club Chester on a one-year deal.

Career statistics

Honours
Cambridge United
Conference Premier play-offs: 2013–14
FA Trophy: 2013–14

F.C. Halifax Town
National League North play-offs: 2016–17
FA Trophy: 2015–16

References

External links
Kevin Roberts profile at the Wrexham A.F.C. website

1989 births
Living people
Footballers from Liverpool
English footballers
Association football defenders
Association football midfielders
Association football utility players
Chester City F.C. players
Cambridge United F.C. players
Brackley Town F.C. players
FC Halifax Town players
Wrexham A.F.C. players
Chester F.C. players
English Football League players
National League (English football) players